Daviesia uniflora is a species of flowering plant in the family Fabaceae and is endemic to the south-west of Western Australia. It is a spreading or low-lying shrub with hairy branchlets, crowded egg-shaped, sharply-pointed phyllodes with the narrower end towards the base and pale yellow and purple flowers.

Description

Taxonomy
Daviesia uniflora was first formally described in 1922 by Desmond Herbert in the Journal and Proceedings of the Royal Society of Western Australia from specimens he collected with Herbert Ward Wilson near Yoting in 1922. The specific epithet (uniflora) means "one-flowered".

Distribution and habitat
This daviesia mainly grows in kwongan in the area between Kojonup, Ravensthorpe and the Great Eastern Highway in the Avon Wheatbelt and Mallee bioregions of south-western Western Australia.

Conservation status
Daviesia uniflora is classified as "not threatened" by the Government of Western Australia Department of Biodiversity, Conservation and Attractions.

References

uncinata
Taxa named by Michael Crisp
Plants described in 1995
Flora of Western Australia